Kathleen Anne Marshall (born 4 June 1953) is a British solicitor and legal scholar, specialising in child law. From 1989 to 1994, she was director of the Scottish Child Law Centre. From 2004 to 2009, she was Scotland's Commissioner for Children and Young People. She has been involved in a number of inquiries into child abuse: she chaired the Edinburgh Inquiry into Abuse and Protection of Children in Care (report produced in 1999) and she chaired the Independent Inquiry into Child Sexual Exploitation in Northern Ireland (report produced in 2014).

Early life and education
Marshall was born on 4 June 1953. She studied law at the University of Glasgow, graduating with a Bachelor of Laws (LLB) degree in 1973.

Career
After graduating from university in 1973, Marshall became a legal apprentice. After qualifying as a solicitor, she worked for the Glasgow Corporation (IE Glasgow City Council) and then for Glasgow DC. She then took a break from her career to have children, and was a full-time mother between 1977 and 1989.

In 2004 she became the Children and Young People's Commissioner Scotland. In September 2008, she announced that she would not be seeking reappointment.

Selected works

References

1953 births
Living people
Children and Young People's Commissioners in Scotland
British solicitors
Academics of the University of Glasgow
British legal scholars
Alumni of the University of Glasgow